Placodiscus bancoensis is a species of plant in the family Sapindaceae. It is found in Ivory Coast and Ghana. It is threatened by habitat loss.

It was first described by André Aubréville and François Pellegrin in 1936.

References

bancoensis
Vulnerable plants
Taxonomy articles created by Polbot
Taxa named by François Pellegrin
Taxa named by André Aubréville